Luis Paulo Silva Junior (born 14 April 2000), commonly known as Paulo Junior, is a Brazilian professional footballer.

Career statistics

Club
.

Notes

References

2000 births
Living people
Brazilian footballers
Association football defenders
Kategoria e Parë players
Centro Sportivo Alagoano players
Associação Atlética Portuguesa (RJ) players
KS Burreli players
Brazilian expatriate footballers
Brazilian expatriate sportspeople in Albania
Expatriate footballers in Albania